Ralph Stocker Stadium is owned by the city of Grand Junction, Colorado. Its current tenants are Colorado Mesa University Mavericks football, District-51 high school football, and the Grand Junction Gladiators semi-pro minor league football team, though it hosts other local events as well including track and field and both college and high school commencement ceremonies. The stadium is adjacent on its east side to Suplizio Field.

Renovations
In June 2011, both venues underwent an $8.3 million renovation project to replace the aging  bleacher sections and press box on the east side of the stadium, along with the adjoining first base bleachers at Suplizio Field, with a new section that includes new seating for both venues as well as a new two-story press box and handicapped-accessible mezzanine level which was ready for use by May 2012.

Notes

Colorado Mesa University
American football venues in Colorado
Buildings and structures in Mesa County, Colorado
College football venues
Colorado Mesa Mavericks football
1949 establishments in Colorado
Sports venues completed in 1949
High school football venues in the United States